Teenage Boss is an Australian reality television series on ABC ME which is based on a Norwegian format. Teenage Boss is hosted by mathematician Eddie Woo and produced by McAvoy Media.

The series sees a range of teenagers from diverse families put in charge of the monthly budget to teach them valuable lessons about financial responsibility and planning. The first season screened in 2018 and a second season began in 2020.

References

External links
 

Australian Broadcasting Corporation original programming
2018 Australian television series debuts
Australian children's television series